Manuel Soares Monge is a Portuguese military and political figure. He is a general in the Portuguese army. He was born in Vila Nova de São Bento 18 February 1938, in Serpa Municipality.

During the colonial war he made four tours of duty in Africa: two in Portuguese Angola, the last two in Portuguese Guinea.
In 1968, he was appointed commander in chief of Portuguese Guinea.

He was then a Portuguese army major and one of the faithful of António de Spínola, who was one of the important people of the Carnation Revolution which occurred on 25 April 1974.

He was a member of the Movimento dos Capitães and Comissão Coordenadora do MFA and military advisor to the President and given responsibility for relations with Macau.

He was civil governor of the District of Beja until 2011.

References

1938 births
Living people
People from Serpa
Portuguese generals
Portuguese politicians
20th-century Portuguese military personnel
21st-century Portuguese military personnel